AANAT is a gene that encodes an enzyme aralkylamine N-acetyltransferase. It is the key regulator of day-night cycle (circadian rhythm). It is found in all animals. In humans it is present on chromosome 17, in chimpanzees chromosome 17, in mouse and sheep chromosome 11, in rat chromosome 10, and in chicken chromosome 18.

Function 

The protein encoded by this gene belongs to the acetyltransferase superfamily. It is the penultimate enzyme in melatonin synthesis and controls the night/day rhythm in melatonin production in the vertebrate pineal gland. Melatonin is essential for the function of the circadian clock that influences activity and sleep. This enzyme is regulated by cAMP-dependent phosphorylation that promotes its interaction with 14-3-3 proteins and thus protects the enzyme against proteasomal degradation.

Clinical significance 

This gene may contribute to numerous genetic diseases such as delayed sleep phase syndrome.

References  
 

Circadian rhythm

External links